Naksan Mountain or Mount Naksan (lit. The mountain is well known for the panoramic views of downtown Seoul as is Namsan.

The mountain and its surrounding area is Naksan Park, which is a public park maintained by the city government from 2002. The park was used as the filming location for some dramas.

See also
List of mountains in Korea
List of parks in Seoul

References

Mountains of Seoul
Jongno District
Tourist attractions in Seoul